Dan Llywelyn Hall (born 1980) is an artist who grew up in Barry, South Wales. Known for his landscapes and portrait paintings, Hall has exhibited throughout the UK in public galleries such as the National Portrait Gallery with his portrait The Last Tommy. In 2013 he was commissioned by the WRU to paint a portrait of Queen Elizabeth II becoming the 133rd artist to sit portray her.  In 2014, Hall's portrait of Prince William was unveiled in the Wales Office by the Secretary of State for Wales, David Jones.

In 2015, Hall became the first artist-in-residence at the Cannes Film Festival. For the 75th anniversary of the Dambusters Raid, he made 133 portraits of all the men who participated in the mission. In 2021, Hall completed an exhibition and book Walking with Offa / Cerdded gydag Offa - a collaboration with poets including Gillian Clarke, Menna Elfyn, Owen Sheers and Ifor ap Glyn. In 2022, Hall attended the Queen's funeral procession and depicted it in the Queen's Procession in Real Time.

Portraits 
 
In 2009 the artist had a sitting in Bath and made a portrait of the last surviving 'Tommy' veteran of WW1, Harry Patch.

Dan Llywelyn Hall became the 133rd artist to officially paint a portrait of Queen Elizabeth II, titled Icon.

In 2016 he painted a portrait of Barbara Windsor, titled An East End Girl. Windsor unveiled it at L'Escargot, London.

Hall also made a portrait of pop singer Marc Almond, which Almond unveiled in 2019.

Public collections 
The Royal Collection with The Last Tommy (Harry Patch), and The Last Volunteer (Henry Allingham), both veterans of WW1.

MoMA Wales acquired Fan-Hir for its permanent collection in 2005.

The National Library of Wales has 25 items by or related to Hall.

The Contemporary Art Society of Wales has an oil painting of Hall's, The Wreckage of Carnedd Llewellyn.

Campaigning 
In 2017, Hall led a campaign to save Sheffield Street Trees in which he depicted some of the trees under threat.

In 2018, Hall was invited to support the anti-HS2 campaign which threatened Euston Square Gardens.

In 2021, Hall was involved in a campaign to save parts of Offa's Dyke.

Awards 
In 2009 Hall was one of 51 exhibitors in the 2009 BP Portrait Award with The Last Tommy.

References

External links 
 

Welsh contemporary artists
1980 births
Living people